Little Chester, also known as Chester Green after the area of open parkland at its centre, is a suburb of the city of Derby, in Derbyshire, England. It forms part of the Darley ward along with Darley Abbey and the West End. Little Chester is the oldest inhabited part of Derby, having been the location of a fortified Roman settlement called Derventio.

History

Roman times

It is the most historic area of Derby, the location of a large fortified Roman settlement, which they called Derventio. This fort, which later became a town, was not only protected the river crossing, but also stood at the junction and gave protection to five Roman roads. The most important was Ryknield Street, which connected Gloucester and the West Country with Yorkshire and the North East.

Little of the Roman settlement remains at Little Chester today, apart from two Roman wells, one on Marcus Street and the other in the garden of the vicarage of St Paul's Church. However, a series of excavations in the last fifty years have established both its importance and prosperity, including the discovery of an underfloor heating system on Parker’s Piece and an abundance of coins.

Later times
The district has been continually inhabited since the departure of the Romans, next being settled by Angles. Chester Green, the open land which is the centrepiece of the area, is first referred to by name in written records dating back to 1495, and has been a public park since 1866. In modern times the name Chester Green, applied to the district as a whole, seems to have overtaken the "correct" name in popular usage.

References

External links

Areas of Derby